Vardi Kahana (born 1959) is an Israeli photographer.

Biography 
Kahana was born in Tel Aviv in 1959. She grew up in a religious family and attended Zeitlin school. She studied art in HaMidrasha – Faculty of the Arts, Beit Berl College, but did not graduate.

At the beginning of the 1980s, Kahana began her career in photography reporting for Monitin magazine, and within a short period of time settled into magazine photography. As part of her job she has photographed a variety of Israeli figures.

In 1983, she joined Hadashot newspaper, working there until 1993 when the newspaper closed. In 1995, she began working for 7 days newspaper, which is held by Yedioth Ahronoth.

Exhibitions 
In recent years, she has exhibited her works at many solo shows around the world, including The Public Library in Amsterdam, Fotomuseum Antwerp, Jewish Museum of Belgium, Pecci Museum, Tel Aviv Museum of Art, Academy of Arts, Berlin, Jewish Museum Munich, Haifa Museum of Art, Contemporary Jewish Museum in San Francisco.  Major retrospectives of her work have been shown in The Art Gallery at Yad Labanim Ramat HaSharon and "The Artists House" in Rehovot.

Solo exhibitions 

 1992 'Photography : Vardi Kahana', Camera Obscura Gallery, TelAviv, Israel
 2001 'Beauty Has Cut Itself Of', Ramat Gan Museum, Israel
 2007 'Israeli portrait', Artist's House, Tel Aviv Israel
 2007 'One Family', Andrea Meislin Gallery NY NY
 2007 'One Family', Tel Aviv Museum of Art, Tel Aviv, Israel
 2008 'One Family', Pecci Museum, Prato, Italy
 2008 'A Photographer of people', Academy of Design and Photography, Haifa, Israel
 2008 'One Family', Academie der Kunste, Berlin, Germany
 2008 'One Family', Photo Museum, Antwerp, Belgium
 2008 'One Family', The Jewish Museum, Brussels, Belgium
 2009 'One Family', Arts Depot, London, England
 2010 'One Family', The Public Library, Amsterdam, Holland
 2010 'One Family', Sinti and Roma Museum, Heidelberg, Germany
 2010 'One Family', The Bundestag, Berlin, Germany
 2012 'Near and Far', The Artists House, Rehovot, Israel
 2013 'Fields of Vision', The Art Gallery at Yad Labanim, Ramat Hasharon, Israel
 2015 'One Family', The Center for Jewish Life, Princeton University

Works 
Her most famous photograph, from 10 February 1983, depicts a demonstration of the Peace Now movement in Jerusalem, on which Emil Grunzweig appears a few minutes before his assassination.

Kahane's works are in the collection of the Israel Museum, Jerusalem.

Recently, Kahana became curator of Local Testimony – a Middle East regional exhibition of photojournalism.

Books

Awards 
 2011. Sokolov Award for outstanding achievements in journalism. Kahana is the first photographer receiving this award.

References

External links

Yedioth Aharonot's Yigal Sarna, Vardi Kahana win Sokolov Prize
Vardi Kahana in Israel Museum
Vardi Kahana in Bundestag
 by Hanoch Marmari
 by Emily Long and Melissa Ross

1959 births
Living people
Israeli photographers
Israeli Jews
People from Tel Aviv
Portrait photographers
Israeli women photographers
HaMidrasha – Faculty of the Arts alumni